Atari David Bigby (born September 19, 1981) is a former American football safety. He was signed by the Miami Dolphins as an undrafted free agent in 2005. He played college football at the University of Central Florida.

Bigby has also been a member of the New York Jets, Green Bay Packers, Seattle Seahawks, and the San Diego Chargers. With the Packers, Bigby won Super Bowl XLV against the Pittsburgh Steelers.

Early years
Bigby attended Miami High School in Miami, Florida where he lettered three years in football and two in track.  He attended high school with safety Marquand Manuel, Houston Texans wide receiver Andre Johnson, Tampa Bay Buccaneers wide receiver Roscoe Parrish, Philadelphia Eagles offensive lineman Jamaal Jackson, and Miami Heat forward Udonis Haslem. As a prep player at Miami (Fla.) Senior High School, played every position on the field other than lineman. His senior year, Bigby recorded 72 tackles, four forced fumbles, and one interception, on defense. On offense, he had 500 receiving yards, 315 rushing yards, and nine touchdowns. Bigby earned second-team Class 6A all-state honors and also played in the Dade-Broward All-Star Game.

College career
As a redshirt freshman at University of Central Florida, Bigby played in 11 games and made 38 tackles.

Professional career

Miami Dolphins
After going undrafted in the 2005 NFL Draft, Bigby was signed by the Miami Dolphins as an undrafted free agent on May 16, 2005. He was later waived by the Dolphins on July 25, 2005, prior to the start of the preseason.

New York Jets
Bigby was signed by the New York Jets on August 11, 2005, only to be waived during final cuts on September 3.

Green Bay Packers

Atari was originally signed to the Packers practice squad on November 1, 2005. Was then promoted to the active roster on December 22, 2005  and made his NFL debut on December 25 against the Chicago Bears. He was inactive for the final contest against the Seattle Seahawks.

Bigby was waived by the Packers at the end of the 2006 preseason, but was signed two days later to their practice squad. After spending the first 10 weeks of the season on the Packers' practice squad, Bigby was signed to the active roster on November 15, 2006. He recorded two tackles during the season.

After a very successful 2007 training camp and preseason, Bigby replaced starting strong safety Marquand Manuel, who was released prior to the 2007 regular season. Bigby was named the NFC Defensive Player of the month for December 2007. Bigby tied for the NFL lead with four interceptions during the month in just four games. The Packers posted a 3-1 record in December and clinched the NFC North division, locking up the No. 2 seed in the NFC playoffs. Bigby posted an interception in three of Green Bay's four December games. He had a 22-yard interception in Week 14 and recorded a career-high two interceptions the next week against St. Louis. Bigby finished the month with an interception in the Packers' win over Detroit.

On January 12, Bigby started his first playoff game against the Seattle Seahawks. He finished the game with seven tackles (one for a loss), a forced fumble and a pass defensed. Bigby had two big hits, one that led to a Marcus Pollard fumble that was recovered by Green Bay's defensive end Aaron Kampman. Green Bay took the lead on the ensuing drive.

An exclusive-rights free agent in the 2008 offseason, Bigby signed a one-year tender deal with the Packers.

Bigby had the Packers' first 2008 interception in season opener against the Minnesota Vikings on Monday Night Football, picking off quarterback Tarvaris Jackson in the fourth quarter. He played in just seven games during the season due to injuries and was placed on season-ending injured reserve with a shoulder injury on December 18. Bigby finished the 2008 season with 21 tackles, two pass deflections and an interception.

On February 26, 2009, Bigby received a second-round tender offer worth $1.545 million from the Green Bay Packers. He was free to sign a contract with another team when he became a free agent on the 27th, but the Packers had the right to match the deal.

Bigby won his first Super Bowl when the Packers defeated the Pittsburgh Steelers in Super Bowl XLV. Bigby was the first player to emerge from the tunnel when the Packers were introduced.

Seattle Seahawks
Bigby signed with the Seattle Seahawks on August 16, 2011, and played in 15 regular season games.

San Diego Chargers
Bigby signed with the San Diego Chargers on March 16, 2012.

On March 8, 2013, Bigby was released by the Chargers.

Career statistics

Personal life
Atari Bigby was born in Jamaica and moved to the United States at age 4. He was named by his grandmother, who liked the name Atari. "Atari" is a Japanese word meaning "hit a target", akin to an English speaker exclaiming "bullseye!". During his time at UCF, he insisted he was not named after the video game console of the same name.
He is married to Jill and has 2 daughters, Michelle, born in 2001, and Leenah, born in 2004 and 3 sons, Atari Kente Bigby, who was born February 10, 2008. David Bigby who was born in 2011, and Joshua, who was born in 2014.

References

External links

Seattle Seahawks bio

1981 births
Living people
Jamaican players of American football
Miami Senior High School alumni
Players of American football from Miami
American football safeties
UCF Knights football players
Miami Dolphins players
New York Jets players
Green Bay Packers players
Amsterdam Admirals players
Seattle Seahawks players
San Diego Chargers players
People from Trelawny Parish